Outstanding Supporting Actress may refer to one of several awards, including:

 Daytime Emmy Award for Outstanding Supporting Actress in a Drama Series
 NAACP Image Award for Outstanding Supporting Actress in a Motion Picture
 Primetime Emmy Award for Outstanding Supporting Actress in a Comedy Series
 Primetime Emmy Award for Outstanding Supporting Actress in a Drama Series
 Primetime Emmy Award for Outstanding Supporting Actress in a Limited Series or Movie
 Screen Actors Guild Award for Outstanding Performance by a Female Actor in a Supporting Role

See also
 List of awards for supporting actor